Seasons of Tragedy is the second studio album by the American heavy metal band Benedictum, released through Locomotive Records in 2008.

Track listing
All songs written by Veronica Freeman, Pete Wells, Jesse Wright & Paul Courtois, except where noted.
"Dawn of Seasons" (Instrumental) – 1:26
"Shell Shock" – 4:25
"Burn It Out" – 3:32
"Bare Bones" – 5:11
"Within the Solace" – 4:21
"Beast in the Field" – 6:37
"Legacy" – 5:35
"Nobodies Victim" – 4:44
"Balls to the Wall" (Accept cover; written by Udo Dirkschneider, Wolf Hoffmann, Hermann Frank, Peter Baltes & Stefan Kaufmann) – 5:44
"Steel Rain" – 5:46
"Seasons of Tragedy" – 11:37
"Catch the Rainbow" (Rainbow cover and bonus track; written by Ronnie James Dio & Ritchie Blackmore) - 6:34

Personnel

Benedictum
Veronica Freeman – vocals
Pete Wells – rhythm & lead guitar
Jesse Wright – bass
Paul Courtois – drums, percussion

Additional musicians
George Lynch, Craig Goldy, Manni Schmidt: Additional Lead Guitars
Chris Morgan: Keyboards, Piano, Synthesizers, Synthesized Strings

Production
Arranged by Benedictum
Produced by Jeff Pilson

Recorded & Mixed by Tommy Henriksen
Mastered by Brad Vance

2008 albums
Benedictum albums
Locomotive Music albums